Melvin Bernard Breath (March 28, 1881 – July 1, 1950) was an American lawyer and politician who served in the Massachusetts House of Representatives; and on the Board of Aldermen, and as the thirtieth Mayor of Chelsea, Massachusetts.

Early life
Breath was born on March 28, 1881, to Melvin L. and Maria (Noone) Breath.

Education
Breath attended the Chelsea, Massachusetts public schools, he graduated from Chelsea High School, Boston College and Boston University School of Law.

Law practice
Melvin B. Breath was a partner, with Robert W. Frost, in the law firm of Frost and Breath, their offices were in the Tremont Building (no. 817), 110 Tremont Street, Boston, Massachusetts.

Notes

1881 births
1950 deaths
Boston College alumni
Boston University School of Law alumni
Massachusetts lawyers
Lawyers from Chelsea, Massachusetts
Mayors of Chelsea, Massachusetts
Massachusetts city council members
Democratic Party members of the Massachusetts House of Representatives
20th-century American politicians
20th-century American lawyers